This is a list of notable sandwiches. In American English, a sandwich is understood to be a dish consisting of two or more pieces of bread with one or more fillings between them, or one slice in the case of an open sandwich; however, in British English (and some other national English varieties), the definition of sandwich is narrower, requiring a sandwich to be made with bread sliced from a loaf, not other forms of bread such as rolls, buns, bagels or muffins. This list article uses the American definition, so some of the sandwiches listed herein may not be considered sandwiches in other national varieties of English.

Sandwiches are a common type of lunch food often eaten as part of a packed lunch. There are many types of sandwiches, made from a diverse variety of ingredients. The sandwich is the namesake of John Montagu, 4th Earl of Sandwich, a British statesman. Sandwiches can also have notable cultural impact.

Major types of sandwiches include:
 Two slices of bread with other ingredients between
 Two halves of a baguette or roll with other ingredients between
 Hero, hoagie, or submarine sandwich
 Open-faced sandwich
 Pocket sandwich

Sandwich cookies and ice cream sandwiches are generally not considered sandwiches in the sense of a bread-containing food item, but are named by analogy.

Sandwiches

See also

 Hot dog variations
 List of bread dishes
 List of hamburgers
 List of submarine sandwich restaurants
 Sandwich bread
 Soup and sandwich

References

Sandwiches
sandwiches